Raghunandan Sharma is the name of:

 Raghunandan Sharma (Rajgarh), former BJP MLA from Rajgarh, Madhya Pradesh
 Raghunandan Sharma (Mandsaur) (born 1946), BJP MP, currently in the Rajya Sabha from Madhya Pradesh